John Russell Thomas (July 24, 1924 – March 19, 1991) was an American football tackle who played four seasons with the Detroit Lions of the National Football League (NFL). He was drafted by the Lions in the third round of the 1946 NFL Draft. He played college football at Ohio State University after attending Charleston High School in Charleston, West Virginia. His playing career ended in 1949 after he suffered a knee injury. Thomas was an assistant coach on the Detroit Lions' 1952 and 1953 NFL Championship teams. He also served as the general manager of the Lions from 1967 until his retirement in 1989. He was unpopular with Lions fans for his tough stance at the negotiating table and the scapegoat for the team's mediocrity during his tenure. He died in his sleep on March 19, 1991. The Detroit Lions players wore a silver football shaped patch on the left chest of their jerseys with the initials 'JRT' in his memory during the 1991 season.

References

External links
 Just Sports Stats

1924 births
1991 deaths
American football tackles
Ohio State Buckeyes football players
Detroit Lions coaches
Detroit Lions executives
Detroit Lions players
National Football League general managers
Sportspeople from Charleston, West Virginia
People from Lincoln County, West Virginia
Players of American football from West Virginia